Katherine Marjorie Shannon, better known as Kitty Shannon (3 February 1887 – 24 November 1974), was an English artist and illustrator. Her father was the artist Sir James Jebusa Shannon, for whom she was a frequent sitter.  In 1912, she married Walter Keigwin and they had two children.

Works

Her work includes illustration for:

 The Devil on Two Sticks by Alain-René Lesage published by Hutchison.
 Henry VIII and His Wives by Walter Jerrold. New York, G.H. Doran, 1926.
 "Venus in Trousers", the fictionalised biography of George Sand, 1938

External links
 Illustrations to The Devil on Two Sticks
 Online edition of ''The Devil on Two Sticks'

References 

English illustrators
1887 births
1974 deaths